Porcellio ovalis is a species of woodlouse in the family Porcellionidae. It is endemic to the Canary Islands.

References

Porcellionidae
Endemic fauna of the Canary Islands
Arthropods of the Canary Islands
Crustaceans described in 1893